The Laurel incident occurred when the United States intercepted a letter of congratulation from Spain's Foreign Ministry to Filipino President José Laurel on 18 October 1943. 

While the Francoist State intended the message as a polite response to a message of friendship sent by Laurel, the United States government interpreted the message as Spanish recognition of the new government. Other Axis countries also disseminated the message as a sign of support from Spain. 

While Spain maintained a close relationship with the Axis powers, Spain also maintained diplomatic and trade relations with the United States. Spain was dependent on imports of oil and grain, and many in the US had long pushed for a stronger stand against Spain. The Laurel telegram became an important cause in both the press and the U.S. Congress.

Spain was a major producer of tungsten, a crucial material to Germany's war effort. The United States had launched a program at great expense to buy the entirety of Spain's tungsten production, but some still went to feed Germany's war machine. The United States used the incident to put pressure on Spain to stop all exports of tungsten to Germany.

The Allies also wanted Spain to expel German agents from Tangier, the return of Italian ships following the Italian armistice, and landing rights in Spain for Allied commercial planes. However, none of these demands were met.

The crisis resulted in an oil embargo by the United States against Spain.

See also 
 Wolfram Crisis

References

Spain in World War II
United States in World War II
1943 in Europe
Francoist Spain
1943 in the United States
1943 in Spain
1943 in international relations
Spain–United States relations
1943 in the Philippines
Philippines–Spain relations
Diplomatic incidents
Foreign relations of Spain during the Francoist dictatorship